Andi LaVine Arnovitz (born 1959) is an American-Israeli printmaker and multimedia artist.

Work 
Arnovitz is an activist/feminist artist who works in a variety of media. Her primary source of inspiration is paper, she considers herself a paper-manipulator, a bookmaker and an assemblage artist. Her pieces often reflect her affinity for pattern, surface, and thread, a passion she developed as a child wandering through her father’s fabric store in Kansas City.

Her focus is the flashpoint where gender, politics and religion meet. Of great concern to her are primary issues surrounding the differences between Jews and Arabs, between religious and non-religious, between Jewish law and contemporary society, between men and women, between young and old. Over and over these politics and tensions are explored, examined and dissected in her works. She is a self-described feminist artist who subverts traditionally feminine materials, using them to create awareness, protest, dialogue, and disapproval.

Life
Arnovitz was born in 1959, in Kansas City, Missouri. She graduated from Washington University in St. Louis with a Bachelor's in Fine Arts. She credits the conceptual ideas behind many of her pieces to her experience working in advertising as an art director, creating print campaigns and television commercials.

She is married David Arnovitz, and they have five children. In 1999, Andi and her family moved to Jerusalem, Israel. A two year sabbatical became a permanent stay, and much of her work is informed by the multitudinous differences of living in the Middle East. She previously worked at the Jerusalem Print Workshop in Israel .

Exhibitions 
Her work appeared at the Stern Gallery, Shulamit Gallery, and the Jerusalem Biennale.

Her work has appeared in the following museums:
The Jewish Museum Berlin, Germany
The Museum of Art Haifa, Israel
The Herman Struck Museum, Haifa
HUC Museum, New York, NY
 The Eretz Israel Museum, Tel Aviv, Israel
 Hebrew Union College Museum NYC
The Museum of Biblical Art NYC
 Yeshiva University Museum NYC
 The Museum of Art, Ein Harod, Israel

Her work is in the permanent collections of the United States Library of Congress, the Israel National library. Yale University Library, The Magnes Collection and Yeshiva University Museum The Smithsonian Museum, The Museum of the Diaspora, Tel Aviv.
She has participated in group shows in England, France, Norway, Poland, Lithuania, Spain, Italy, Canada and the United States.

References

External links

http://www.andiarnovitz.com/
https://web.archive.org/web/20141023215545/http://womenofthebook.org/artists/andi-arnovitz/
http://shma.com/author/andi/

1959 births
Living people
20th-century American women artists
21st-century American women artists
People from Kansas City, Missouri
Artists from Jerusalem
American printmakers
Sam Fox School of Design & Visual Arts alumni
Washington University in St. Louis alumni